Chah Kand (also Romanized as Chāh Kand) is a village in Fasharud Rural District, in the Central District of Birjand County, South Khorasan Province, Iran. At the 2016 census, its population was 99, in 50 families.

References 

Populated places in Birjand County